Weslley may refer to:

 Weslley (footballer, born 1982), full name Weslley Morais Sousa, Brazilian football midfielder
 Weslley (footballer, born January 1992), full name Weslley Silva Santos Rodrigues, Brazilian football defender
 Weslley (footballer, born April 1992), full name Weslley Smith Alves Feitosa, Brazilian football forward

See also
Wesley (disambiguation)